Coptosia chehirensis is a species of beetle in the family Cerambycidae. It was described by Stephan von Breuning in 1943, originally under the genus Conizonia. It is known from Turkey.

References

Saperdini
Beetles described in 1943